Yuval Ashkenazi (born 13 February 1992) is an Israeli professional footballer who plays as a midfielder for Israeli Premier League club Bnei Sakhnin.

Early life
Ashkenazi was born in Givatayim, Israel, to a family of Jewish descent.

Club career
He made his Israeli Premier League debut for Bnei Yehuda Tel Aviv on 23 September 2017 in a game against Hapoel Acre.

Honours

Club 
Bnei Yehuda Tel Aviv
 Israel State Cup: 2018–19

Maccabi Haifa
 Israeli Premier League: 2020–21
 Israel Toto Cup (Ligat Ha'Al): 2021–22
 Israel Super Cup: 2021

References

External links
 

1992 births
Living people
Israeli footballers
Jewish footballers
Footballers from Givatayim
Hapoel Ramat Gan F.C. players
Hapoel Azor F.C. players
Maccabi Kiryat Malakhi F.C. players
Hapoel Kfar Shalem F.C. players
Bnei Yehuda Tel Aviv F.C. players
Maccabi Haifa F.C. players
Maccabi Netanya F.C. players
Bnei Sakhnin F.C. players
Israeli Premier League players
Association football midfielders
Israeli Jews